The men's 200 metres event at the 2017 European Athletics U23 Championships was held in Bydgoszcz, Poland, at Zdzisław Krzyszkowiak Stadium on 14 and 15 July.

Medalists

Records
Prior to the competition, the records were as follows:

Results

Heats
14 July

Qualification rule: First 3 (Q) and the next 4 fastest (q) qualified for the semifinals.

Wind:Heat 1: +0.9 m/s, Heat 2: +1.2 m/s, Heat 3: +0.5 m/s, Heat 4: +1.0 m/s

Semifinals
15 July

Qualification rule: First 3 (Q) and the next 2 fastest (q) qualified for the final.

Wind:Heat 1:  +0.9 m/s, Heat 2: +0.9 m/s

Final

15 July

Wind: +1.6 m/s

References

200 metres
200 metres at the European Athletics U23 Championships